Allopleuron is a genus of extinct sea turtle, which measured  long in life. The type species is Allopleuron hofmanni. It is a basal member of the clade Pancheloniidae, closely related to Protosphargis. Similar to Protosphargis, it was characterized by shell reduction.

Fossil history 

Allopleuron lived from the Early Cretaceous (Cenomanian age, 94.3 Ma) to the Oligocene (Rupelian age, 28.4 Ma), therefore surviving the Cretaceous-Paleogene extinction event. Fossils have been found from Germany, the Netherlands, Kazakhstan and the United States.

Life history 
Allopleuron was believed to have used the Laurasian-Holarctic southern continental shelf as a breeding area. The modern day location of the breeding ground is along the coast of Asia. Allopleuron is believed to have eaten jellyfish, seaweed, or carcasses. It is believed that adult male Allopleuron lived off the coast of southeast Netherlands, and northeast Belgium due to the large amount of fossils in these areas. The area is believed to have been a sea grass meadow that was able to sustain the large population. The lack of remains from juvenile Allopleuron indicate that the young of the species lived elsewhere.

Phylogeny 
Evers et al. (2019):

References

Prehistoric turtles of Asia
Late Cretaceous turtles
Prehistoric turtles of Europe
Prehistoric turtle genera
Fossil taxa described in 1831
Taxa named by John Edward Gray
Cheloniidae
Extinct turtles
Turtle genera